Gun Talk (also known as Tom Gresham's Gun Talk) is an American syndicated radio program hosted by Tom Gresham. It currently runs on 270+ radio stations across the United States.  Debuting in 1995, the show covers topics including firearms, shooting, hunting, and gun policy. The show broadcasts from Mandeville, Louisiana.

Host Tom Gresham is a son of Grits Gresham, who hosted the ABC TV show The American Sportsman from 1966 to 1979. Gresham described his show in a 2013 interview with Politico as "Car Talk about guns, with politics thrown in."  Gresham has been a writer, editor and photographer for 50 years, and has held editor positions at a number of national magazines including "American Hunter," "Alaska Magazine," "Outdoor Life," "Rifle," and "Handloader."  He also has created, produced, directed and hosted a number of television series, including "Personal Defense TV," "Gun Venture," "Guns and Gear," "Wings To Adventure," and "Shooting Sports America."

References

External links
Gun Talk official website

American talk radio programs
1995 establishments in the United States
Gun politics in the United States